Sulochana Brahaspati (born 1937, in Allahabad) is one of the noted vocalist of Hindustani classical music.

In 1994, she was awarded the Sangeet Natak Akademi Award,  the highest Indian recognition given to practicing artists, given by the Sangeet Natak Akademi, India's National Academy of Music, Dance & Drama.

Background
She is a vocalist and an exponent of the Rampur-Sadarang Parampara. She learned music from Pandit Bholanath Bhat and Ustad Mushtaq Hussain Khan (d. 1964) of Rampur-Sahaswan Gharana. Later she received intensive training from her guru, and her husband, Acharya K.C.D. Brahaspati. A large number of his compositions – Khayals, Thumris, Tappas, and Dadras – are part of her portfolio.

She is also an accomplished teacher and musicologist and has published books including Raga Rahasya.

Awards
 Sangeet Natak Akademi Award in 1994.
 Uttar Pradesh Sangeet Natak Academy Award in 1984.
 Tansen Samman by Madhya Pradesh government in 2006.

References

Sources

External links 
 Artist's Official Website

Recipients of the Sangeet Natak Akademi Award
Musicians from Allahabad
1937 births
Living people
Indian women classical singers
Hindustani singers
Women Hindustani musicians
Singers from Uttar Pradesh
20th-century Indian singers
20th-century Indian women singers
Women musicians from Uttar Pradesh